His Religion And Hers is a book written by Charlotte Perkins Gilman in 1922, after she had moved with her husband from New York City to Norwich, Connecticut. In the book, she planned a religion freed from the dictates of oppressive patriarchal instincts.

1922 non-fiction books
Feminism and spirituality